The Raj are a Muslim community found in  the state of Uttar Pradesh in India.

See also
 Hajjam

References

Muslim communities of Uttar Pradesh